Mel Croucher (born 1948) is a British entrepreneur and video games pioneer. Originally an architect, he moved into computers and in 1977 launched one of the very earliest games companies, Automata UK, as an extension of his publishing business. He is now credited for setting up "the first games company in the U.K.", celebrated as "the father of the British videogames industry" and presented as "a pioneer in affective computing". His first broadcasts of computer game software were made over AM and FM radio. After the release of the Sinclair ZX81, his label published several games for the early home computer market, including three Computer Trade Association award-winners: Pimania (1982), Groucho (1983, a.k.a. My Name Is Uncle Groucho, You Win A Fat Cigar), and the groundbreaking "multi-media" title Deus Ex Machina (1984). Croucher has championed immersive entertainment throughout his career as director and producer, mixing audio, video, spoken word, real-world locations and computer-generated effects.

Career
Croucher has written text books, computer manuals and comedy, and worked as a journalist, writing regular columns like Without Prejudice, The Rubber Room, and the comedy sci-fi serial Tamara Knight for the ZX Spectrum magazine CRASH in the 1980s, as well as columns for various computer magazines since.

Mel Croucher is the author of Zygote in Computer Shopper every month since Issue 1 in 1988 and the Mel's World column and the Great Moments In Computing cartoon strip in the same magazine.

In 2010 Feeding Tube Records, a small label in the United States, released "Pimania: The Music of Mel Croucher", a deluxe vinyl LP album of the music to the Pimania games, as well as tracks from other Automata releases. The album came with extensive liner notes by Croucher and Caroline Bren, as well as a large poster featuring selections from the original Automata print campaigns. A 6-album retrospective of his music complete works was released in 2017 by The Games Collector.

In 2012, Mel Croucher reformed Automata as Automata Source Ltd., with leading figures from the video games, online marketing and music industries. He produced a reimagination of Deus Ex Machina, starring Sir Christopher Lee, released in 2015 as Deus Ex Machina 2, alongside a 30th Anniversary Collector's Edition of the original game including new graphics and a director's commentary. He collaborated with Christopher Lee on several other games titles, and their game for children was released as Eggbird in the same year.

Mel Croucher is Executive Chairman of Jeeni, the global streamed music service and artist development platform, which he co-founded with Dr Shena Mitchell in 2017.

Video games
The Pathfinder Quests (1977-1980)
Whitbread Quiz Time and the Computer Treasure Hunt (1979)
The Adventures of Willi Nilli (1981)
The Portsmouth Tapes (1981)
In The Best Possible Taste (1981)
Can Of Worms (1981)
Love And Death (1982)
The Bible (1982)
Pimania (1982)
Dragon Doodles & Demos (1983)
Spectrum Spectacular (1983)
Bunny/ETA (1983) - Croucher wrote the ETA portion of the game.
Yakzee (1983)
My Name Is Uncle Groucho, You Win A Fat Cigar (1983)
Pi-Eyed (1984)
Olympimania (1984)
Deus Ex Machina (1984)
iD (1986)
Castle Master (1990) story and book of the game
Deus Ex Machina 2 (2015)
Deus Ex Machina 30th Anniversary Collector's Edition (2015)
Eggbird (2015)

Books and journalism
Namesakes, with Jon Pertwee, Sphere Books
Easy AMOS, Europress
AMOS Professional, Europress
Email Direct Marketing, (2000) Institute of Practitioners in Advertising, 
European Computer Trade Yearbook (as Editor)
Sam Coupé User Guide, Miles Gordon Technology
Devil's Acre, Acorn Books
Deus Ex Machina - The Best Game You Never Played In Your Life, (2014) Acorn Books, 
Great Moments In Computing (2017), Acorn Books, 
Last Orders: What You're Worth and Who Benefits When You Die (2017), AG Books, 
Pibolar Disorder (2018), Acorn Books, 
Short Pants (2018), Acorn Books, 
Great Moments The Complete Edition (2022), Acorn Books,

External links
Official site of melcroucher.net
Official site of Jeeni Ltd
The Automata Songs World Of Spectrum archive of music by Mel Croucher.
Interview with Mel Croucher from May 2001, ZX Golden Years.
Transmedia stories Interview with Mel Croucher and others from January 2011, on Transmedia storytelling

References

1948 births
Living people
British businesspeople
British journalists
British video game designers
Video game businesspeople